The Bibi Mariam Cannon is a large early modern artillery piece on display on the grounds of the Osmani Udyan in Dhaka, Bangladesh. The cannon dates from the 17th century.

History
The cannon was manufactured by local technicians on the orders of Mir Jumla II, the governor of Bengal under Emperor Aurangzeb. It was one of two large cannons; the other was the "Kaley Khan Jam Jam". The two cannons were given male and female names. They were used during Mir Jumla's invasion of Assam and later placed in front of the Bara Katra to ward off Arakanese pirates. The Bibi Mariam survived, but its male named counterpart was lost. In 1832, the British administration moved the Bibi Mariam from Bara Katra to the Chowk Bazaar area of Old Dhaka. It was later moved to Gulistan during the East Pakistan period and finally to the Osmani Udyan after Bangladesh was created.

See also
List of the largest cannon by caliber

References

External links

Large-calibre artillery
Individual cannons
Military history of Bangladesh
History of Dhaka